The Ohio lamprey (Ichthyomyzon bdellium) is a lamprey found in the Ohio River drainage basin in the United States and is a parasitic species of lampreys. They are considered to be an endangered/rare species in some states, due to siltation, pollution, and construction of dams.

Description 
All lampreys have a long, almost eel-like, body with no scales. Lampreys have segments of muscles that are visible along their body called myomeres, and a jawless mouth. In larval lampreys, called ammocoetes, their mouth is not fully developed, very small, and hidden between folds of skin. Adults have a disk shaped mouth with varying amounts of teeth depending on the species. The Ohio lamprey has a single, continuous dorsal fin. Fully grown, Ohio lampreys reach 10-14 inches, but may get to 15 inches.

Diet 
As ammocoetes, Ohio lamprey filter plankton, algae, and other small organic matter. As adults, they attach onto larger prey, such as smallmouth bass, walleyes, redhorse suckers and trout and feeding on blood and body fluids. Ohio lampreys do not appear to kill the host fish, as they evolved with other fishes in their range. As a result, they do not appear to have a significant effect on populations of their host fishes.

Reproduction 
As a sexually mature adult, Ohio lamprey will seek out suitable breeding sites. They likely do not return to their natal site to spawn, but this remains untested. Spawning occurs in late May or early June, with adults working together or in pairs to create a pit in riffles of moderate currents. They use their suction cup-like mouth to move rocks from these riffles, and then the female lamprey deposits eggs into this pit after mating. All adults will die after spawning.

Distribution 
The Ohio lamprey is found throughout the Ohio River basin in 11 states: Alabama, Georgia, Indiana, Kentucky, New York, North Carolina, Ohio, Pennsylvania, Tennessee, Virginia, and West Virginia. The Ohio lamprey used to be found in Illinois, but is now considered to be extirpated; the last sighting was in 1918.

References 

 https://web.archive.org/web/20130111034246/http://www.bio.utk.edu/hulseylab/Fishlist.html
 http://www.dnr.state.oh.us/Default.aspx?tabid=22725
 http://fishandboat.com/pafish/fishhtms/chap4.htm
 http://ohiodnr.com/watercraft/tabid/2588/Default.aspx
 http://www.fs.fed.us/r9/wildlife/tes/ca-overview/docs/Fish/Ohio%20lamprey.pdf

Petromyzontidae
Animal parasites of fish
Fish described in 1885
Taxa named by David Starr Jordan